Elizabeth Priscilla Cooper Tyler (June 14, 1816 – December 29, 1889) was the daughter-in-law of John Tyler, the tenth president of the United States.  She served as official White House hostess and first lady of the United States from September 1842 to June 1844.

Background and early life
Priscilla Cooper was born in New York City in 1816. Her father, Thomas Apthorpe Cooper, was a successful stage actor and producer. Her mother, Mary Fairlie Cooper, was a New York socialite. Cooper's maternal grandfather, James Fairlie (1757-1830), was a veteran of the American Revolutionary War.

Cooper began to work as an actress at the age of 17. The family was successful in their field, and they were well-off until their fortune was lost in the Panic of 1837. The family lost their house on Broadway and at one point were reduced to subsisting on radishes and strawberries.

While playing Desdemona in a production of Othello in Richmond, Virginia, she met Robert Tyler, the eldest son of wealthy plantation owner and former US Senator John Tyler. In 19th century America, acting was considered a scandalous profession, and actresses had little social standing. The addition of the Coopers' financial woes seemed to conspire to make any match between the two unlikely. Despite their social differences, the couple wed in Bristol, Pennsylvania on September 12, 1839. After their marriage, the couple moved to Williamsburg, Virginia to live with Robert's family where John and Letitia Tyler warmly welcomed her into the Tyler family. Priscilla Tyler became close to her father-in-law and their fondness for each other grew quickly. John Tyler even allowed her to open an account in every store in Williamsburg. She also developed a close bond with her mother-in-law Letitia Tyler.

Together Robert and Priscilla Tyler had eight children:

Mary Fairlei Tyler (1840–1845), died in childhood
Letitia Christian Tyler (1842–1924)
John Tyler (1844–1845), died in infancy
Grace Rae Tyler Scott (1845–1919)
Priscilla Cooper Tyler Goodwyn (1849–1936)
Elizabeth Tyler Foster (1852–1928)
Julia Campbell Tyler Tyson (1854–1884)
Robert Tyler (1857–1939)

Priscilla also suffered eight miscarriages.

John Tyler was the successful candidate for Vice President of the United States in the 1840 election. After the sudden death of President William Henry Harrison just one month after taking office, John Tyler became President of the United States.

White House hostess
By the time John Tyler assumed the presidency, his wife Letitia was a semi-invalid. The first lady's role of White House hostess was delegated to Priscilla Tyler. At only 25 years old, her youth was considered a benefit, and she was delighted with the opportunity to host at the White House.

Tyler ensured that social events were held regularly at the White House while she was responsible for hosting. She held small dinners two times per week while Congress was in session, as well as biweekly public receptions, and larger parties with approximately one thousand guests each month. She also introduced concerts by the United States Marine Band on the south lawn of the White House.

She worked with former first lady Dolley Madison to better prepare for her position, and she learned to navigate Washington social life despite increasing political polarization. Her status as a surrogate or "proxy" hostess reflected a larger trend during the antebellum years in which younger female family members stood in for the wives of presidents. Due to her more prominent role in the White House, Tyler's tenure as surrogate first lady in particular has become more prominent in historical analysis than that of Letitia Tyler.

Tyler was highly regarded by most contemporaries, both in the United States and abroad. She was described as extroverted, attractive, intelligent, and witty.  She was also the first woman acting as first lady to travel with the president as an official member of the presidential party, accompanying John Tyler to Boston for the dedication of the Bunker Hill Monument in June 1843.

Robert and Priscilla Tyler moved to Philadelphia in March 1844, leaving Letitia Tyler-Semple to serve as surrogate first lady. President Tyler remarried on June 26, 1844, and his new wife, Julia Gardiner Tyler, served as White House hostess.

Later years
After leaving the White House, the Tylers resided in Philadelphia until the onset of the American Civil War. Robert practiced law and was active in the Democratic Party. When the Civil War broke out in 1861, the Tylers moved to Virginia, where Robert was register of the Confederate Treasury. After the war, Robert became the editor of the Mail and Advertiser newspaper in Montgomery, Alabama. Tyler stayed in Montgomery after her husband's death in 1877, remaining there until her own death. The personal papers of the Tyler family, including those of Priscilla Cooper Tyler, are held by the Special Collections Research Center at the College of William and Mary.

References

1816 births
1889 deaths
19th-century American actresses
Acting first ladies of the United States
Priscilla Tyler
People from Montgomery, Alabama
People from New York City
People from Philadelphia